Aadhe Adhoore is an Indian television series which aired on Zindagi from 14 December 2015 to 12 April 2016. The story revolved around Jassi who lives in rural Kapurthala in Punjab with a loving mother-in-law and her brother-in-law as her husband works abroad. The show touched on themes of unrequited love and adultery. Despite a complex storyline and well-received acting performances, the show was cancelled after viewers thought the show depicted a  bad woman in Jassi.

Plot 
Jassi is a young married woman who lives with her affectionate mother-in-law, Beeji, and her younger brother-in-law, Varinder. Jassi's husband, Narinder, works abroad and they talk often on the phone figuring out how they can live together. Though she is an ideal daughter-in-law and gets along with everyone at home and in the community, Jassi feels incomplete as she pines for her husband and it is revealed that she and Varinder are having an affair for some time and are deeply in love. Hidden from Beeji, they secretly spend nights together knowing fully well the risk of their relationship.

Soon, Beeji receives a marriage proposal for Varinder and despite his unwillingness, Varinder agrees after Jassi convinces him that this can give their affair an added layer of protection. Jassi discovers she has gotten pregnant and in a state of panic, she and Varinder visit a hospital so she can get an abortion. Witnessed by Varinder's fiancé Nimmi, Jassi and Varinder manage to explain the situation but the wedding is called off. Jassi then decides to find Varinder a match and he is married to the soft-spoken and young Channi.

Now married, Varinder starts caring for chaani, but for how long can it last. Varinder and Jassi's relationship goes through a new phase as Beeji soon discovers their affair.

Cast 

Sonali Nikam as Jassi
Arpit Kapoor as Narinder, Jassi's husband
Varinder, Jassi's brother-in-law
 Geeta Udeshi as Saroj Beeji, Jassi's mother-in-law
 Priyanka Khera as Channi, Varinder's wife
 Manju Sharma as Jeeti Chachi
 Mohak Khurana as Pappu
 Neha Pal as Rani, a young house help who works for Beeji
 Ragini Sharma as Nimmi, Varinder's ex-fiancé
 Neha Chandra as Madhu
 Manav Sohal as Ashok
 Sonam Arora as Poonam

Music
The title song "Aadhe Adhure" also known as "Kyun Hasaye Humein" has been sung by Mahalakshmi Iyer. Another song "Prabhat Feri" has been sung by Sardool Sikander. The lyrics are written by Meenakshi Gupta.

External links 
Aadhe Adhoore on ZEE5

References

Zee Zindagi original programming
2015 Indian television series debuts
Indian drama television series
Indian television soap operas
Television shows set in Punjab, India